Perisse Frères (established c. 1760) was a publishing firm in Lyon, France, established by Jean-André Perisse-Duluc (born 1738) and his brother Antoine. Around 1825 the business expanded to Paris, becoming "Bourguet-Calas et Cie" in 1874. The business in Lyon continued into the 1880s.

Published by the firm

See also
 Books in France

References

External links
 Post-Reformation Digital Library. Perisse Frères
  (Documents the firm's interaction with Société typographique de Neuchâtel)
 WorldCat. Perisse-Duluc, Jean André

French booksellers
1760 establishments in France
Companies based in Lyon
Book publishing companies of France
Mass media in Lyon
18th century in Lyon
19th century in Lyon
French companies established in 1760